Albert Brown (10 July 1911 – 27 April 1995) was an English cricketer and snooker player. He made just one first-class appearance for Warwickshire County Cricket Club in 1932. As a snooker player he was twice runner-up in the English Amateur Championship and reached the semi-final of the World Snooker Championship four times between 1948 and 1953.

Early life
Brown was born in Birmingham on 10 July 1911. He attended a boarding school from the age of seven, where he started playing English billiards on a three-quarter size billiard table and won the school championship for nine successive years. After leaving school, Brown's sporting focus was on cricket rather than cue sports, and he did not play billiards again until the age of 24, shortly after which a friend introduce him to snooker. A year after taking up snooker, Brown won the Midland Amateur Championship, defeating Kingsley Kennerley 4–0 in the final. He won the title again the following year, and after a hiatus in the championship being staged during World War II, completed a run of three wins. Before becoming a professional snooker player, he worked as a bus driver.

Cricket
Between snooker seasons, Brown played cricket. A fast bowler, he was invited to play for Warwickshire after achieving hat tricks in consecutive weeks.

Brown made a single first-class appearance for Warwickshire against the touring Indians at Edgbaston in 1932.  The Indians made 282 all out in their first-innings, with Brown taking the wickets of Naoomal Jeoomal and Amar Singh to finish with figures of 2/61 from 22 overs.  In Warwickshire's first-innings of 354 all out, Brown ended the innings not out on a single run.  He bowled 14 wicketless overs in the Indians second-innings of 344 declared and wasn't required to bat in Warwickshire's second-innings of 110/3, with the match being declared a draw.  This was his only major appearance for Warwickshire. He retired from cricket after failing to recover fully from a pulled muscle.

Snooker
He was runner-up in the English Amateur Championship in 1940, losing 7–8 to Kennerley. The next time the tournament was held, in 1946, Brown lost 3–5 to John Pulman in the final. Both Pulman and Brown and turned professional shortly afterwards.

After turning professional Brown played in a number of major events from 1947 to 1953, and reached the semi-finals of the World Snooker Championship four times, in 1948, 1950, 1952 and 1953. He also was runner-up in the 1951/1952 News of the World Snooker Tournament, missing out on victory by a single frame. His last competitive appearance was in the 1954/1955 News of the World Snooker Tournament.

Non-ranking event wins: (1)
 News of the World Snooker Tournament Qualifying Event – 1949/1950

Death
He died at the city of his birth on 27 April 1995.

References

External links
Albert Brown at ESPNcricinfo

1911 births
1995 deaths
Cricketers from Birmingham, West Midlands
English cricketers
Warwickshire cricketers
English snooker players
English cricketers of 1919 to 1945